GVIR or variation, may refer to:

 A Royal cypher
 King George VI of the United Kingdom, whose Royal Cipher was "George VI Rex"
 Itamar Ben-Gvir (born 1976), Israeli lawyer
 g Vir, a star in the constellation Virgo, see List of stars in Virgo

See also

 George VI (disambiguation)
 virG, a plasmid gene and protein found in Agrobacterium tumefaciens
 Virus G, a virus strain or species, see List of virus species
 VIR (disambiguation)